Zanjirabad (also Romanized as Zanjīrābād; also known as Zanzirābād) is a village in Marhemetabad Rural District, in the Central District of Miandoab County, West Azerbaijan Province, Iran. At the 2006 census, its population was 590, in 145 families.

References 

Populated places in Miandoab County